Billbergia viridiflora is a plant species in the genus Billbergia native to Tabasco, Belize and Guatemala.

Cultivars
 × Billnelia 'Sebastian Laruelle'

References

viridiflora
Flora of Tabasco
Flora of Belize
Flora of Guatemala
Plants described in 1854